Statistics of Bulgarian National Football Division in the 1938–39 season.

Overview
It was contested by 10 teams, and PFC Slavia Sofia won the championship.

League standings

Results

References
Bulgaria - List of final tables (RSSSF)

Bulgarian State Football Championship seasons
Bulgaria
1938–39 in Bulgarian football